Linkage may refer to:

Linkage (album), by J-pop singer Mami Kawada, released in 2010
Linkage (graph theory), the maximum min-degree of any of its subgraphs
Linkage (horse), an American Thoroughbred racehorse
Linkage (hierarchical clustering), The linkage criterion determines the distance between sets of observations as a function of the pairwise distances between observations
Linkage (linguistics), a set of languages descended from a former dialect continuum
Linkage (mechanical), assemblies of links designed to manage forces and movement
Linkage (policy), a Cold War policy of the United States of America towards the Soviet Union and Communist China
Linkage (software), a concept in computer programming
Genetic linkage, the tendency of certain genes to be inherited together
Glycosidic linkage, a type of covalent bond that joins a carbohydrate (sugar) molecule to another chemical group
Flux linkage, the total flux passing through a surface formed by a closed conducting loop

See also
Hyperlink